Klapanunggal or Kelapanunggal is a town and district (Indonesian: Kecamatan) in the Bogor Regency, West Java, Indonesia. It is home to an industrial area that is part of a larger industrial site that also covers various districts in the same regency, including Gunung Putri and Cileungsi.

Because of the industrial area, Klapanunggal is also home to a stable balanced population between local factory/industrial workers, and commuters to the Greater Jakarta area. As a result, from having a rather large number of commuters, the town has Nambo station as a station that connects the town with the local commuter rail, KRL Jabodetabek.

Gallery

References

Districts of Bogor Regency